The 1988 800 km of Jerez was the opening round of the 1988 World Sportscar Championship season.  It took place at Circuito Permanente de Jerez, Spain on March 6, 1988.

Official results
Class winners are in bold.  Cars failing to complete 75% of the winner's distance are marked as Not Classified (NC).

Statistics
 Pole Position - #61 Team Sauber Mercedes - 1:28.670
 Average Speed - 151.186 km/h

References

 

J
Jerez 800